Ślepowrony  is a village in the administrative district of Gmina Nur, within Ostrów Mazowiecka County, Masovian Voivodeship, in east-central Poland.

The village has a population of 94.

References

Villages in Ostrów Mazowiecka County